A wainscot chair is a type of chair which was common in early 17th-century England and colonial America.  Usually made of oak, the term can be used in a general way for a simple heavy chair, or more specifically for a particular style of heavy panel-backed chair as detailed later. The name derives from the fine grade of oak which was used at the time for wainscot panelling.

Details
When used in a specific sense, there are many characteristics that are implied. These include:

 the front legs having been shaped on a lathe
 the back legs being square-sectioned
 having arm supports
 lacking an upholstered seat
 a panel back, sometimes rather plain but often carved with a relatively complex design

References

Chairs